Trade In is a 2009 comedy film in post production, directed by Jackie Lee James. The film was written by Jason Moore, Kris Sharma and Drew Grubich.  The film stars Chris Mascarelli, Tiffany Shepis, and Christina Leigh.

Plot 
Marty owner of the used car dealership Car Kingdom, is thrust into a sales contest against his bitter rival, Wayne Empire of Empire Cars.  Desperate, Marty hires his ex-girlfriend, Gina, as a marketing rep.  Together, they work to focus Marty's misfit sales team and turn them into the top dealership in town. It is a battle of wits and bumbling whim to determine who gets to stay open, and who gets traded in.

Cast
 Christopher Mascarelli as Marty
 Christina Leigh as Gina
 Tiffany Shepis as Crystal
 Ron Jeremy as Richard Steadman
 Corey Haim as himself
 Jason Moore as Victor
 Joe Jones as Wayne Empire
 Richard Pines as Lou
 Noah Todd as Mol
 Dwayne Palmer as Curt
 Benjamin Heflin as Alex
 David A. Aufmuth Sr. as Tony
 Jeremy Frey as Matt
 William Killian as Tom
 Rory Pierce as Jerry
 D. C. Sands as Penis Man
 Elske McCain as Jenny

Production 

The film is set in Tucson, Arizona. Filming locations include local businesses Aufmuth Motors and Howl at the Moon.

Release

World Premiere 
Trade In made its world premiere on September 19, 2009 at the Fox Tucson Theatre, located in downtown Tucson.

References

External links 

 
 

2009 films
2009 comedy films
American comedy films
Films set in Tucson, Arizona
2000s English-language films
2000s American films